Plaza de San Francisco is a square in the Casco Antiguo of Seville, Spain. The Ayuntamiento (City Hall), known as Casa consistorial de Sevilla, built in the 16th century, runs along the entire western side of the square. On the other side of the City Hall is the Plaza Nueva. Both plazas are connected to the Avenida de la Constitución.

History
By the time Seville was reconquered by the Crown of Castile in 1248, a square was already present in this space. It was named Plaza de San Francisco after the Convento de San Francisco, which was the main access to the square between 1268 and 1840. A fish market used to be present in the west side, before the City Hall was built in the 16th century.

Part of the hithertho unlocated Roman walls of Romula Hispalis (3rd century AD) were discovered in the plaza in 2021 during the building works of a hotel.

References

Tourist attractions in Seville
Plazas in Seville
13th-century establishments in Castile
Odonyms referring to religion